Yankee Pasha is a 1954 American romantic adventure film directed by Joseph Pevney and starring Jeff Chandler, Rhonda Fleming and Mamie Van Doren. Shot in technicolor, it was produced and distributed by Hollywood studio Universal Pictures. The film is based on the 1947 novel Yankee Pasha by Edison Marshall.

Plot
Fur trapper Jason Starbuck (Jeff Chandler) arrives in Salem, Massachusetts in 1800. A general store owner challenges him to a horse race, but his rider's fiancée, Roxana Reil, gives a helpful tip to Starbuck on how to win the race.

A romantic attraction develops and Roxana's father advises her not to marry a man she doesn't love. Roxana sets sail for France, however, and her boat is attacked by pirates, who kill her father and take Roxana captive in Morocco, making her a slave.

Starbuck pursues her. He is introduced by a U.S. consul to the sultan, who is impressed with Starbuck's rifle marksmanship. He is offered a position with the sultan's infantry and given a slave of his own, Lilith.

Roxana has been sold to Omar Id-Din, who could be plotting against the sultan. Starbuck challenges Omar to a duel, with the winner acquiring the other's rifle and slave. Starbuck wins and intends to return home with Roxana, but they are betrayed by the jealous Lilith, who fights Roxana and tells Omar of their plans.

Starbuck is taken prisoner. Lilith has a change of heart, however, and changes clothes with Roxana to fool the guards. With the help of Hassan Sendar, one of the sultan's soldiers, they help rescue Starbuck, who leads the escape of other prisoners. He throws Omar from a roof. He and Roxana are free, and, as a reward, Hassan is given a new slave, Lilith.

Jeff Chandler recorded the song I Should Care on Brunswick Records from the film.

Cast

Jeff Chandler as Jason Starbuck
Rhonda Fleming asRoxana Reil
Mamie Van Doren as Lilith, Harem Slave
Lee J. Cobb as Sultan
Bart Roberts as Omar Id-Din
Hal March as Hassan Sendar
Tudor Owen as Elias Derby
Arthur Space as Richard O'Brien
Benny Rubin as Zimil
Phil Van Zandt as Baidu Sa'id
Harry Lauter as Dick Bailey 
John Day as First mate Miller
Christiane Martel as Harem Girl
Myrna Hansen as Harem Girl
Kinuko Ito as Harem Girl
Emita Arosemena as Harem Girl
Synove Gulbrandsen as Harem Girl
Alicia Ibanez as Harem Girl
Ingrid Mills as Harem Girl
Maxine Morgan as Harem Girl
 Mara Corday as Harem Girl 
 Lisa Gaye as 	Harem Girl 
 Marla English as 	Harem Girl 
 Rosalind Hayes as Eliza

Production
The novel was a best seller and Universal bought the film rights as a vehicle for Jeff Chandler.

The film provided Mamie Van Doren with one of her first major movie roles. Universal Pictures was eager to promote Van Doren as their version of Marilyn Monroe, and this seemed to them to be the perfect film to accomplish this.

References

External links

Review of film at Variety

1954 films
American historical adventure films
1950s historical adventure films
1950s historical romance films
Universal Pictures films
Films about slavery
Films based on American novels
Films directed by Joseph Pevney
Pirate films
Films set in Morocco
Films set in the 1800s
American historical romance films
1950s English-language films
1950s American films